Ralph Guggenheim (born June 6, 1951) is an American video graphics designer and film producer. He won a Producers Guild of America Award in 1995 for his contributions to the film Toy Story.

Biography
He was born in New Rochelle, New York to  Hanneleis Feibelmann, a German-Jewish Holocaust survivor, and Jules Guggenheim, a Swiss-born businessman. Guggenheim excelled in his studies at New Rochelle High School and earned admission to Carnegie Mellon University.  At Carnegie Mellon University, Guggenheim became interested in photography and worked for the University.  After graduating with a degree in communications from CMU, Guggenheim stayed in Pittsburgh and graduated in 1977 with a Masters in Computer Science.  

After his time at CMU, Ralph worked for the New York Institute of Technology Computer Graphics Lab.  He was soon contacted by Lucasfilm and moved to California in 1980. During his time at Lucasfilm, Guggenheim developed EditDroid, which proved to be a revolutionary film-editing system. After his research lab at Lucasfilm was sold to Steve Jobs and renamed Pixar, Guggenheim continued to work in the world of graphics and animation.  Guggenheim, a respected founder of Pixar, eventually became Vice President of Feature Animation and co-produced Toy Story alongside Bonnie Arnold. Guggenheim left the company in 1997 after Disney forced Pixar to remove him as producer from Toy Story 2.

Since his time at Pixar, Guggenheim has worked as an executive at Electronic Arts.  After his time at Electronic Arts, Guggenheim started Alligator Planet LLC with three other partners. Guggenheim is currently the CEO of Alligator Planet.

References

External links
 

1951 births
American film producers
Carnegie Mellon University alumni
Computer graphics professionals
Electronic Arts employees
Living people
Lucasfilm people
Artists from New Rochelle, New York
New York Institute of Technology faculty
Pixar people
New Rochelle High School alumni